The Paradelta Break is an Italian single-place paraglider that was designed and produced by Paradelta Parma of Parma. It remained in production in 2016.

Design and development
The Break was designed as a beginner glider. The models are each named for their approximate wing area in square metres.

The glider design was developed into the two-place Paradelta BiBreak.

Variants
Break 22
Extra small-sized model for lighter pilots.
Break 24
Small-sized model for lighter pilots.
Break 26
Mid-sized model for medium-weight pilots.
Break 28
Large-sized model for heavier pilots.

Specifications (Break 26)

References

External links

Break
Paragliders